Primitive Irish or Archaic Irish, also called Proto-Goidelic,  is the oldest known form of the Goidelic languages. It is known only from fragments, mostly personal names, inscribed on stone in the ogham alphabet in Ireland and western Great Britain between the 4th and the 6th century AD.

Characteristics
Many of the characteristics of modern (and medieval) Irish, such as initial mutations, distinct "broad" and "slender" consonants and consonant clusters, are not yet apparent.

More than 300 ogham inscriptions are known in Ireland, including 121 in County Kerry and 81 in County Cork, and more than 75 found outside Ireland in western Britain and the Isle of Man, including more than 40 in Wales, where Irish colonists settled in the 3rd century, and about 30 in Scotland, although some of these are in Pictish. Many of the British inscriptions are bilingual in Irish and Latin; however, none show any sign of the influence of Christianity or Christian epigraphic tradition, suggesting they date from before 391, when Christianity became the official religion of the Roman Empire. Only about a dozen of the Irish inscriptions show any such sign.

Sometimes the phrase , "of the son of the tribe", is used to show tribal affiliation. Some inscriptions appear to be border markers.

Grammar
The brevity of most orthodox ogham inscriptions makes it difficult to analyse the archaic Irish language in depth, but it is possible to understand the basis of its phonology and the rudiments of its nominal morphology.

Nominal morphology 
With the exception of a few inscriptions in the singular dative, two in the plural genitive and one in the singular nominative, most known inscriptions of nouns in orthodox ogham are found in the singular genitive, so it is difficult to fully describe their nominal morphology.

The first ending, is found in words equivalent to the Proto-Celtic o-stem nouns. This category was also registered in the dative as -u, with a possible occurrence of the use of the nominative, also in -u. , in turn, is equivalent to Proto-Celtic i-stems and u-stems, while  corresponds to ā-stems. The exact function of  remains unclear.

Phonology 
It is possible, through comparative study, to reconstruct a phonemic inventory for the properly attested stages of the language using comparative linguistics and the names used in the scholastic tradition for each letter of the ogham alphabet, recorded in the Latin alphabet in later manuscripts.

Vowels 

In later stages of the language, scholastic oghamist traditions incorporated five new letters for vowels, called forfeda, corresponding to digraphs of the orthodox spelling, but these no longer corresponded to Primitive Irish sounds.

Consonants 
The consonant inventory of Primitive Irish is reconstructed by celtologist Damian McManus as follows:

However, evidence of the original distinction between Straif and Sail was still present into the Old Irish period, as the séimhiú (lenition) of  produced  for lexemes with original Straif but  for lexemes with original Sail.

Consonant lenition and palatalisation may already have existed in an allophonic form, i.e., it was not phonologically contrastive yet.

Transition to Old Irish
Old Irish, written from the 6th century onward, has most of the distinctive characteristics of Irish, including "broad" and "slender" consonants, initial mutations, some loss of inflectional endings, but not of case marking, and consonant clusters created by the loss of unstressed syllables, along with a number of significant vowel and consonant changes, including the presence of the letter p, reimported into the language via loanwords and names.

As an example, a 5th-century king of Leinster, whose name is recorded in Old Irish king-lists and annals as Mac Caírthinn Uí Enechglaiss, is memorialised on an ogham stone near where he died. In each case the development of Primitive to Old Irish shows the loss of unstressed syllables and certain consonant changes.

These changes, traced by historical linguistics, are not unusual in the development of languages but appear to have taken place unusually quickly in Irish. According to one theory given by John T. Koch, these changes coincide with the conversion to Christianity and the introduction of Latin learning. Many languages have various registers or levels of formality, the most formal of which, usually that of learning and religion, changes slowly while the most informal registers change much more quickly, but in most cases are prevented from developing into mutually unintelligible dialects by the existence of the more formal register. Koch argues that in pre-Christian Ireland the most formal register of the language would have been that used by the learned and religious strata, the druids, for their ceremonies and teaching. After the conversion to Christianity the druids lost their influence, and formal Primitive Irish was replaced by the then Irish of the common people and Latin, the language of the new learned group, the Christian monks. The vernacular forms of Irish, i.e. the ordinary Irish spoken by the common people (formerly 'hidden' by the conservative influence of the formal register) came to the surface, giving the impression of having changed rapidly; a new written standard, Old Irish, established itself.

See also 
 Irish language
 Early Irish literature
 Goidelic substrate hypothesis

References

Bibliography 

 
 
 
 
 
 
 
 
 
 
 
 
 
 
 
 
 
 
 
 
 

History of the Irish language
Ancient Ireland
Irish, Primitive